Newberry is a village and county seat of Luce County in the U.S. state of Michigan.  The village is located within McMillan Township and is the only incorporated community in Luce County. The population was 1,446 at the 2020 census.

Newberry is surrounded by state and national forests and is considered the southern gateway to the Tahquamenon Falls area, which the other being Paradise to the northeast. Newberry was designated as "the Moose Capital of Michigan" by the state legislature.  The Newberry Correctional Facility is located just south of the village.

History
Newberry was founded in 1882 and became the county seat when Luce County was separated from Chippewa County in 1887.  Its first courthouse was completed in 1890.

The village was named in honor of John Stoughton Newberry, a U.S. Representative and industrialist from the state of Michigan.

Historic preservationists lost the 1970s fight to save the county's Victorian courthouse, but managed to keep the elaborate sheriff's house, now the Luce County Historical Museum.

Wildfires
The Newberry area was the location of two major wildfires. The Sleeper Lakes Fire took place in August 2007 and burned approximately  just north of Newberry. Both wildfires were caused by lightning strikes. While the village itself was not threatened, firefighting efforts were coordinated in Newberry.

Geography

Transportation

Major highways
 runs north–south through the center of Newberry.

Bus service
Indian Trails provides daily intercity bus service between St. Ignace and Ironwood.

Rail
 Canadian National Railway provides freight rail service with a small depot located in Newberry.

Airport
 Luce County Airport is a county-owned public-use general aviation airport that serves Newberry.

Demographics

2010 census
As of the census of 2010, there were 1,519 people, 652 households, and 380 families residing in the village. The racial makeup of the village was 89.3% White, 0.4% African American, 6.3% Native American, 0.3% Asian, 0.1% Pacific Islander, and 3.6% from two or more races. Hispanic or Latino of any race were 2.8% of the population.

There were 652 households, of which 30.1% had children under the age of 18 living with them, 39.1% were married couples living together, 14.3% had a female householder with no husband present, 4.9% had a male householder with no wife present, and 41.7% were non-families. 37.6% of all households were made up of individuals, and 15.7% had someone living alone who was 65 years of age or older. The average household size was 2.26 and the average family size was 2.93.

The median age in the village was 41.1 years. 25.9% of residents were under the age of 18; 5.8% were between the ages of 18 and 24; 23.3% were from 25 to 44; 25.1% were from 45 to 64; and 19.8% were 65 years of age or older. The gender makeup of the village was 47.9% male and 52.1% female.

2000 census
As of the census of 2000, there were 1,686 people, 717 households, and 456 families residing in the village. The racial makeup of the village was 69.92% White, 19.29% African American, 4.95% Native American, 0.67% Asian, 0.04% Pacific Islander, 1.01% from other races, and 4.13% from two or more races. Hispanic or Latino of any race were 3.69% of the population.

There were 717 households, of which 32.6% had children under the age of 18 living with them, 46.7% were married couples living together, 12.4% had a female householder with no husband present, and 36.4% were non-families. 32.5% of all households were made up of individuals, and 18.0% had someone living alone who was 65 years of age or older.  The average household size was 2.36 and the average family size was 2.95.

In the village, the population was spread out, with 18.2% under the age of 18, 12.5% from 18 to 24, 39.4% from 25 to 44, 16.4% from 45 to 64, and 13.6% who were 65 years of age or older.  The median age was 34 years. For every 100 females, there were 181.0 males.  For every 100 females age 18 and over, there were 215.7 males.

The median income for a household in the village was $29,052, and the median income for a family was $36,607. Males had a median income of $29,286 versus $20,956 for females. The per capita income for the village was $17,224.  About 15.6% of families and 18.1% of the population were below the poverty line, including 27.5% of those under age 18 and 8.4% of those age 65 or over.

Education

The village is served by Tahquamenon Area Schools, which contains a single main campus within Newberry.  The school district serves all of Luce County.  The district also serves Hulbert Township to the east in Chippewa County, as well as Seney Township to the west in Alger County.  Most of Portage Township to the south in Mackinac County is also served by Tahquamenon Area Schools.

It is also noted as the largest school district in the country east of the Mississippi River. The district enrolled 573 students for the 2019–2020 school year.

Climate
According to the Köppen Climate Classification system, Newberry has a humid continental climate, abbreviated "Dfb" on climate maps. A humid continental climate (Köppen prefix D and a third letter of a or b) is a climatic region defined by large seasonal temperature differences, with warm to hot (and often humid) summers and cold (sometimes severely cold in the northern areas) winters. Precipitation is usually distributed throughout the year. The definition of this climate regarding temperature is as follows: the mean temperature of the coldest month must be below −3 °C (26.6 °F) and there must be at least four months whose mean temperatures are at or above 10 °C (50 °F). In addition, the location in question must not be semi-arid or arid. The Dfb, Dwb and Dsb subtypes are also known as hemiboreal.

Media
The Newberry community has been served by The Newberry News, a weekly independent newspaper, since 1886. 

In addition to radio stations broadcasting directly from Newberry, radio stations from the Sault Ste. Marie market can also be heard in the community.

 96.7 FM - WMJT Flash FM (Rock)  Serving Newberry and Luce County, Michigan
 1450 AM - WNBY-AM (Classic country)
 88.7 FM - W204AQ (Christian adult contemporary)
 93.9 FM - WNBY-FM (Oldies)
 96.7 FM - WMJT (Classic hits)
 97.9 FM - WIHC (Christian talk)
 99.7 FM - W259AD (Christian talk & music)

Notable people
Terry O'Quinn, who plays John Locke on Lost, is from Newberry.
Rob Rubick, former Detroit Lion and analyst for Fox Sports Detroit, is from Newberry.
Len St. Jean, a former Boston Patriot, is from Newberry.
Ian Fishback, Retired Special Forces Major, was from Newberry.

Images

References

External links

Village of Newberry official website
McMillan Township official website
Newberry Area Chamber of Commerce
Newberry Area Tourism Association

Villages in Luce County, Michigan
Villages in Michigan
County seats in Michigan
Populated places established in 1882
1882 establishments in Michigan